Peter Levin is an American director of film, television and theatre.

Career
Since 1967, Levin has amassed a large number of credits directing episodic television and television films. Some of his television series credits include Love Is a Many Splendored Thing, James at 15, The Paper Chase, Family, Starsky & Hutch, Lou Grant, Fame, Cagney & Lacey, Law & Order and Judging Amy.

Some of his television film credits include Rape and Marriage: The Rideout Case (1980), A Reason to Live (1985), Popeye Doyle (1986), A Killer Among Us (1990), Queen Sized (2008) and among other films.

Prior to becoming a director, Levin worked as an actor in several Broadway productions. He trained at the Carnegie Mellon University. Eventually becoming a theatre director, he directed productions at the Long Wharf Theatre and the Pacific Resident Theatre Company. He also co-founded the off-off-Broadway Loft Theatre and was also an associate artist of The Interact Theatre Company.

References

External links

American film directors
American television directors
English-language film directors
American theatre directors
Carnegie Mellon University College of Fine Arts alumni
Living people
Place of birth missing (living people)
Year of birth missing (living people)